James J. Burnett was a Scottish professional footballer who played as a forward.

References

People from Aberdeen
Scottish footballers
Association football forwards
Victoria United F.C. players
Aberdeen F.C. (1881) players
Portsmouth F.C. players
Dundee F.C. players
Grimsby Town F.C. players
Brighton & Hove Albion F.C. players
Leeds City F.C. players
English Football League players
Southern Football League players
Year of birth missing